Sergey Alekseyevich Vorobiev (Russian: Сергей Алексеевич Воробьев; born 3 October, 1994) is a Russian professional boxer. As of 2018 he held the Russian super welterweight title. He is best known for ending Konstantin Ponomarev's unbeaten record.

Vorobiev turned pro in 2016 when he stopped Sergey Dyachkov in the third round. He went on to win five more fights, all in the early rounds. In July 2018, Vorobiev fought the undefeated Konstantin Ponomarev for the vacant Russian title. It took place on the Oleksandr Usyk vs Murat Gassiev undercard. Vorobiev won a close split decision over Ponomarev, ending his unbeaten record. In his most recent fight, Vorobiev outpointed Argentinian boxer Abel Nicolas Adriel after eight rounds.

Professional boxing record

References

Living people
1994 births
Russian male boxers
Light-middleweight boxers
People from Shlisselburg
Sportspeople from Leningrad Oblast